The 6th Standing Committee of the Supreme People's Assembly (SPA) was elected by the 1st Session of the 6th Supreme People's Assembly on 17 December 1977. It was replaced on 5 April 1982 by the 7th SPA Standing Committee.

Members

References

Citations

Bibliography
Books:
 

6th Supreme People's Assembly
Presidium of the Supreme People's Assembly
1977 establishments in North Korea
1982 disestablishments in North Korea